Trader Vic's is a restaurant and tiki bar chain headquartered in Emeryville, California, United States. Victor Jules Bergeron, Jr. (December 10, 1902 in San Francisco – October 11, 1984 in Hillsborough, California) founded a chain of Polynesian-themed restaurants that bore his nickname, "Trader Vic". He was one of two people who claimed to have invented the Mai Tai. The other was his amicable competitor for many years, Donn Beach of the "Don the Beachcomber" restaurants.

History 
Bergeron attended Heald College in San Francisco. On November 17, 1934, using $500 in borrowed money, Bergeron opened a small bar/restaurant across from his parents' grocery store at San Pablo Avenue and 65th Street in the Golden Gate District of Oakland. He named it Hinky Dink's. As its popularity spread, the menu and decor developed an increasingly tropical flair, and Hinky Dink's soon became Trader Vic's.

In 1949, Western Hotels executive Edward Carlson convinced Bergeron to open his first franchised location in the Benjamin Franklin Hotel in Seattle. Originally a small bar named The Outrigger, it was expanded into a full restaurant in 1954 and renamed Trader Vic's in 1960. Due to the restaurant's success, Bergeron worked with Western Hotels to open Trader Vic's locations in a number of their hotels. In 1950, Bergeron opened a Trader Vic's location in Hawaii and in 1951 at 20 Cosmo Place in San Francisco.

Because Bergeron lacked the capital to expand, he partnered with Hilton Hotels. Conrad Hilton opened his first Trader Vic's in The Beverly Hilton in 1955. Two years later, Hilton opened another Trader Vic's in The Palmer House in Chicago, and then licensed the Trader Vic's brand for use throughout his chain for $2,000,000, retaining Bergeron to oversee the decoration, staffing and operation of the restaurants for an annual salary of $65,000. Hilton soon estimated the popular Trader Vic's establishments were earning his hotel chain $5 million a year. Sheraton Hotels quickly opened competing chains of tiki restaurants in their hotels, known as Ports O' Call and Kon-Tiki.

During the Tiki culture fad of the 1950s and 1960s, as many as 25 Trader Vic's restaurants were in operation worldwide. They all featured the popular mix of Polynesian artifacts, unique cocktails, and exotic cuisine. The chain of restaurants grew and is credited as one of the first successful themed chains, a marketing model that many other restaurants followed.

In 1972 the original location in Oakland was closed and replaced by a bayfront restaurant in  nearby Emeryville, now considered the chain's flagship restaurant. In the 1980s and 1990s, the chain began to shrink as a younger generation had little connection to the chain's tiki theme. Poor locations or less trendy addresses took a toll on the chain's popularity. While many of the original locations have closed, Trader Vic's once again has grown to 18 locations around the globe due to a revival in popularity of tiki culture. 

As of 2022, there are three Trader Vic's restaurants in the United States, two in Europe, ten in the Middle East, two in East Asia, and one in Seychelles. 

The Trader Vic's Corporation has also franchised restaurants and bars under the names the Mai Tai Lounge (all locations defunct), Trader Vic's Island Bar & Grill (opened 2010 in Sarasota, Florida, shuttered in 2013 - where the company experimented with a Hooters-like concept but not a true Hooters knockoff), and Señor Pico. There is one remaining Señor Pico location at The Palm Dubai.

Drinks
Beyond the Mai Tai, Bergeron's other more famous drinks included the Fog Cutter and the Scorpion Bowl. Both drinks were served in a specific and highly decorated mug or bowl. His take on a Hot buttered rum was also an early example calling for a specific ceramic mug, in this case a skull. The Scorpion Bowl in particular and its many variations proliferated onto the cocktail menus of virtually all subsequent Tiki bars. The menus from his restaurants could list dozens of different tropical drinks. As was the case with Don the Beachcomber, rum was the hallmark ingredient in most of his cocktails, but Vic is also credited with creating the Eastern Sour, which employed less common (for Tiki drinks) rye whiskey, and another drink using even more rarely used tequila (the Mexican El Diablo).

Headquarters
The company is headquartered in Emeryville, California.

At times the company had its headquarters in several locations in the San Francisco Bay Area, including Corte Madera and San Rafael.

According to the Trader Vic's website, the Mai-Tai was invented by "Trader Vic" Bergeron in 1944 in Oakland, CA.

Current locations

Former locations

Books of recipes and stories
Trader Vic's Book of Food and Drink (1946)
Bartender's Guide by Trader Vic (1947)
Trader Vic's Kitchen Kibitzer (1952)
Trader Vic's Pacific Island Cookbook (1968)
Trader Vic's Bartenders Guide (1972)
The Menehunes (1972)
Trader Vic's Book of Mexican Cooking (1973)
Frankly Speaking: Trader Vic's Own Story (1973)
Trader Vic's Rum Cookery & Drinkery (1974) 
Trader Vic's Helluva Man's Cookbook (1976)

Books published by third parties 
Trader Vic's Tiki Party!: Cocktails & Food to Share with Friends
Cocktails of the South Pacific and Beyond (with a detailed early history of Trader Vic's original location)
Smuggler's Cove: Exotic Cocktails, Rum, and the Cult of Tiki by Martin Cate with Rebecca Cate discusses the franchise

In popular culture 
 
The song "Werewolves of London," a Top 40 hit co-written by Warren Zevon and appearing on his 1978 album Excitable Boy, contains the line "I saw a werewolf drinking a piña colada at Trader Vic's." The Trader Vic's in London opened in 1963.

The restaurant is also referenced by Bill Murray's character, Frank Cross, to John Forsythe's character, Lew Hayward, in the 1988 movie Scrooged.

In the film Frost/Nixon the character of David Frost orders takeout from Trader Vic's while staying in The Beverly Hilton, which formerly had a Trader Vic's location inside the hotel. The character orders a cheeseburger. 

In the film Thunder Force Jason Bateman and Melissa McCarthy dine at a Trader Vic's.

In the New York Times bestseller and 2012 100 Notable Books, Beautiful Ruins, by Jess Walter, Trader Vic's in Seattle Washington is the setting of a scene between two characters in September 1967. In Chapter 16, "After the Fall" a couple meet at Trader Vic's and one walks "into a burst of warm air and bamboo, tiki and totem, dugout canoe hung from the ceiling."

See also
 Trader Joe's, which was inspired in part by the success of Trader Vic's

References

External links

Trader Vic's company website

Tiki culture
Tiki bars
Restaurant chains in the United States
Theme restaurants
1934 establishments in California
Companies based in Emeryville, California
Restaurants in the San Francisco Bay Area
Pearl District, Portland, Oregon
20th-century American businesspeople